Molecular design software is notable software for molecular modeling, that provides special support for developing molecular models de novo.

In contrast to the usual molecular modeling programs, such as for molecular dynamics and quantum chemistry, such software directly supports the aspects related to constructing molecular models, including:
 Molecular graphics
 interactive molecular drawing and conformational editing
 building polymeric molecules, crystals, and solvated systems
 partial charges development
 geometry optimization
 support for the different aspects of force field development

Comparison of software covering the major aspects of molecular design

Notes and references

See also

External links 
molecular design IUPAC term definition.
Journal of Computer-Aided Molecular Design
Molecular Modeling resources
Materials modelling and computer simulation codes
Click2Drug.org Directory of in silico (computer-aided) drug design tools.
Journal of Chemical Information and Modeling
Journal of Computational Chemistry

Science software
Computational chemistry software
Molecular dynamics software
Molecular modelling software